is a French term for a person from the city of Tours.

It can also refer to:
 Adolphe Guillet dit Tourangeau (1831–1894), Québecois politician
 Huguette Tourangeau (1938–2018), Québecois opera singer
 the Oïl dialect spoken in the province of Touraine